Boomer Township may refer to:

Boomer Township, Pottawattamie County, Iowa
Boomer Township, Wilkes County, North Carolina

Township name disambiguation pages